The Rattlesnake is a 1913 silent film short produced by the Lubin Manufacturing Company and distributed by the General Film Company. It was directed by and starred Romaine Fielding with stage star Mary Ryan. This film exists incomplete in the Library of Congress collection.  It was filmed in Las Vegas.

Cast
Romaine Fielding as Tony
Mary Ryan as Inez
Maurice Cytron as Jones (*as Mortiz Cytron)
Jesse Robinson as John Gordon (*as Jess Robinson)
Alice Danzinger as The Child
Billie Brockwell as Tony's Mother
Gladys Brockwell as Tony's Sister
Al Jacoby as Inez's Father
Eleanor Mason as Inez's Mother
Ludwig Ilfield as The Surveyor

References

External links
 The Rattlesnake at IMDb.com

1913 films
1913 short films
American silent short films
Lubin Manufacturing Company films
Films directed by Romaine Fielding
American black-and-white films
1910s American films
Silent American Western (genre) films